KSAN-TV (channel 3) is a television station in San Angelo, Texas, United States, affiliated with NBC. It is owned by Mission Broadcasting, which maintains joint sales and shared services agreements with Nexstar Media Group, owner of CBS affiliate KLST (channel 8), for the provision of certain services. Both stations share studios on Armstrong Street in San Angelo, while KSAN-TV's transmitter is located north of the city on SH 208.

History
The station signed on February 8, 1962, as KACB-TV, a satellite of Abilene's KRBC-TV. Originally owned by the Ackers family, the stations were sold to Sunrise Television in 1998. Sunrise relaunched KACB as the third full-fledged station in the San Angelo market, with its own news department, local advertising, and programming line-up, on October 1. In 2002, Sunrise merged with LIN TV; the following year, LIN turned around and sold KACB and KRBC to Mission Broadcasting. On October 1, Mission renamed the station KSAN-TV.

Both KSAN and KRBC, though now separate stations, remain under the same ownership (Mission Broadcasting).

The KSAN-TV call letters were originally assigned to an early UHF station operating on channel 32 in San Francisco, which first began operations in 1954, but had a relatively small audience for many years, since few Bay Area television sets had UHF tuners in the 1950s. The channel is now occupied by non-commercial KMTP-TV.

Subchannels
The station's digital signal is multiplexed:

On June 15, 2016, Nexstar announced that it has entered into an affiliation agreement with Katz Broadcasting for the Escape (now Ion Mystery), Laff, Grit, and Bounce TV networks (the last one of which is owned by Bounce Media LLC, whose COO Jonathan Katz is president/CEO of Katz Broadcasting), bringing the four networks to 81 stations owned and/or operated by Nexstar, including KSAN-TV and KLST.

News operation
KSAN presently broadcasts 9 hours of locally produced newscasts each week (with 1½ hours each weekday, one hour on Saturdays and a half-hour on Sundays); unlike most NBC affiliates in Texas, the station does not broadcast any local morning newscasts.

The newscast debuted on October 1, 1998.

References

External links

NBC network affiliates
Ion Mystery affiliates
Laff (TV network) affiliates
Television channels and stations established in 1962
SAN-TV
Nexstar Media Group
1962 establishments in Texas
Ion Television affiliates